Park Soon-ae (born 21 April 1965) is a South Korean professor of public policy at Seoul National University who served as Education Minister and ex officio  Deputy Prime Minister of Social Affairs under President Yoon Suk-yeol in 2022. 

She holds three degrees in administration - a bachelor and a master's from Yonsei University and a doctorate from University of Michigan.

References 

Living people
1965 births
People from Busan
Yonsei University alumni
University of Michigan alumni
Academic staff of Seoul National University
Deputy Prime Ministers of South Korea
Education ministers of South Korea
Women government ministers of South Korea
South Korean women academics
21st-century South Korean women politicians
21st-century South Korean politicians